Melinda Ademi (born 19 November 1995), known professionally as Melinda, is a Kosovan-American rapper, singer and songwriter. She gained notice in 2011 competing on the television program American Idol at the age of 16. In 2019, she relaunched her music career in Kosovo.

Life and career

1995–present: Early life and career beginnings 

Melinda Ademi was born on 19 November 1995 into an Albanian family in the city of Mitrovica, FR Yugoslavia (modern-day Kosovo). Her family left Kosovo and moved to the United States as refugees due to the persecution of Albanians associated with the disintegration of Yugoslavia and the following Kosovo War. In 2011, she began her career on the talent show American Idol. She returned to the same contest two years later, reaching the semifinals. In 2015, she released her first single "Purr" and the further release of "Lulija" in 2018 gained her recognition in the Albanian-speaking world.

Artistry 

Ademi has stated that she is a fan of Albanian singer and songwriter Elvana Gjata.

Discography

Singles

As lead artist

References 

1995 births
21st-century Albanian rappers
21st-century Albanian women singers
21st-century American rappers
21st-century American women singers
21st-century American singers
Albanian women rappers
Albanian-language singers
Albanian songwriters
American women songwriters
American Idol participants
American people of Albanian descent
Kosovan people of Albanian descent
Kosovan rappers
Kosovan women singers
Living people
Musicians from Mitrovica, Kosovo
People from Yonkers, New York
21st-century women rappers